Plectophila is a genus of moths of the family Xyloryctidae.

Species
, Plectophila includes the following species:
 Plectophila acrochroa (Turner, 1900)
 Plectophila discalis (Walker, 1865)
 Plectophila electella (Walker, 1864)
 Plectophila eucrines (Turner, 1898)
 Plectophila micradelpha (Turner, 1898)
 Plectophila placocosma Lower, 1893
 Plectophila pyrgodes Turner, 1898
 Plectophila sarculata Lucas, 1901
 Plectophila thiophanes (Turner, 1917)
 Plectophila thrasycosma (Meyrick, 1915)

References

 
Xyloryctidae
Taxa named by Edward Meyrick
Xyloryctidae genera